East Main Street is a bus rapid transit station on the CTfastrak line, located near the intersection of East Main Street (CT-174) and Wilson Street east of downtown New Britain, Connecticut. It opened with the line on March 28, 2015. The station consists of two side platforms, staggered on opposite corners of the intersection of East Main Street and the busway.

References

External links

Buildings and structures in New Britain, Connecticut
CTfastrak
Transport infrastructure completed in 2015
2015 establishments in Connecticut
Bus stations in Hartford County, Connecticut